The Minister for Seniors is the government minister in the New Zealand Government with responsibility for the rights and interests of senior citizens.

The post was established by the Fourth Labour Government on 24 July 1990. It was split from the Social Welfare portfolio.

History 
The following ministers have held the office of Minister for Seniors.

Key

Notes

References  

Lists of government ministers of New Zealand
Political office-holders in New Zealand